The 2019 Redcar and Cleveland Borough Council election took place on 2 May 2019 to elect members of Redcar and Cleveland Borough Council in England. This was on the same day as other local elections.

Result summary

Ward results

Belmont

Brotton

Coatham

Dormanstown

Eston

Grangetown

Guisborough

Hutton

Kirkleatham

Lockwood

Loftus

Longbeck

Newcomen

Normanby

Ormesby

Saltburn

Skelton East

Skelton West

South Bank

St. Germain's

Teesville

West Dyke

Wheatlands

Zetland

References

2019 English local elections
May 2019 events in the United Kingdom
2019
2010s in North Yorkshire